The Casper 250/SOFAR is a civilian-developed "backpack" unmanned air vehicle made in co-operation by Top I Vision Ltd and WB Electronics Sp. z o.o. The aircraft is produced by both companies on the same rights: WB Electronics produces it in Poland as WB Electronics SOFAR and Top I Vision in Israel as Casper 250. It is designed as a reconnaissance platform with real-time data acquisition. 
The Casper 250 system consists of the aircraft, its payload, ground controlling system and data-link components.

The Casper 250 was designed for quick deployment and simple human-machine interface.

Applications 
Typical military missions include:
battlefield surveillance;
target acquisition and designation;
battlefield monitoring;
air strike control;
border patrol;
coast guard surveillance;
damage assessment.

The Casper 250 system can also be used for civil or commercial application such as:
pollution control at ground sea and air;
natural disasters monitoring;
forest fire monitoring and control;
fishery and navigation control;
general installations security;
gas pipelines and oil rigs security.

Capabilities 
The aircraft possesses the following characteristics and capabilities:
Electric propulsion, providing for quiet, covert operation;
Hand launched, self-recovery, man-deployable;
GPS navigation allows for fully autonomous missions;
Service ceiling: 2000 feet;
Operational Endurance 1.5 hours;
Line of Sight data-link range > 10 km;
Real-time IMINT (imagery intelligence);
Payload Control.

References
WB Electronics corporate web site
Top I Vision corporate web site
Israeli page about SOFAR

Unmanned aerial vehicles of Poland
Unmanned aerial vehicles of Israel